The House of Bernarda Alba is a play by the Spanish dramatist Federico García Lorca.  Commentators have often grouped it with Blood Wedding and Yerma as a "rural trilogy". Garcia Lorca did not include it in his plan for a "trilogy of the Spanish land" (which remained unfinished at the time of his murder).

Garcia Lorca described the play in its subtitle as a drama of women in the villages of Spain. The House of Bernarda Alba was Garcia Lorca's last play, completed on 19 June 1936, two months before Garcia Lorca's death during the Spanish Civil War. The play was first performed on 8 March 1945 at the Avenida Theatre in Buenos Aires. The play centers on the events of a house in Andalusia during a period of mourning, in which Bernarda Alba (aged 60) wields total control over her five daughters Angustias (39 years old), Magdalena (30), Amelia (27), Martirio (24), and Adela (20). The housekeeper (La Poncia) and Bernarda's elderly mother (María Josefa) also live there.

The deliberate exclusion of any male character from the action helps build up the high level of sexual tension that is present throughout the play. Pepe "el Romano", the love interest of Bernarda's daughters and suitor of Angustias, never appears on stage. The play explores themes of repression, passion, and conformity, and inspects the effects of men upon women.

Plot summary
Upon her second husband's death, domineering matriarch Bernarda Alba imposes an eight-year mourning period on her household in accordance with her family tradition. Bernarda has five daughters, aged between 20 and 39, whom she has rigidly controlled and prohibited from any form of relationship. The mourning period further isolates them and tension mounts within the household.

After a mourning ritual at the family home, eldest daughter Angustias enters, having been absent while the guests were there. Bernarda fumes, assuming she had been listening to the men's conversation on the patio. Angustias inherited a large sum of money from Bernarda's first husband, while Bernarda's second husband has left only small sums to his four daughters. Angustias' wealth attracts a young, attractive suitor from the village, Pepe el Romano. Her sisters are jealous, believing it unfair that plain, sickly Angustias should receive both the majority of the inheritance and the freedom to marry and escape their suffocating home.

Youngest sister Adela, stricken with sudden spirit and jubilation after her father's funeral, defies her mother's orders and dons a green dress instead of remaining in mourning black. Her brief taste of youthful joy shatters when she discovers that Angustias will be marrying Pepe. Poncia, Bernarda's maid, advises Adela to bide her time: Angustias will probably die delivering her first child. Distressed, Adela threatens to run into the streets in her green dress, but her sisters manage to stop her. Suddenly they see Pepe coming down the street. Adela stays behind while her sisters rush to get a look, until a maid hints that she could get a better look from her bedroom window.

As Poncia and Bernarda discuss the daughters' inheritances upstairs, Bernarda sees Angustias wearing makeup. Appalled that Angustias would defy her orders to remain in a state of mourning, Bernarda violently scrubs the makeup off her face. The other daughters enter, followed by Bernarda's elderly mother, Maria Josefa, who is usually locked away in her room. Maria Josefa announces that she wants to get married; she also warns Bernarda that she'll turn her daughters' hearts to dust if they cannot be free. Bernarda forces her back into her room.

It is revealed that Adela and Pepe are having a secret affair. Adela becomes increasingly volatile, defying her mother and quarreling with her sisters, particularly Martirio, who reveals her own feelings for Pepe. Adela shows the most horror when the family hears the latest gossip about how the townspeople recently tortured a young woman who had delivered and killed an illegitimate baby.

Tension explodes as family members confront one another, leading to Bernarda pursuing Pepe with a gun. A gunshot is heard outside the home. Martirio and Bernarda return and imply that Pepe has been killed. Adela flees into another room. With Adela out of earshot, Martirio tells everyone else that Pepe actually fled on his pony. Bernarda remarks that as a woman she can't be blamed for poor aim. A loud noise is heard; Bernarda immediately calls for Adela, who has locked herself into a room. When she doesn't respond, Bernarda and Poncia force the door open. Poncia's shriek is heard. She returns with her hands clasped around her neck and warns the family not to enter the room. Adela, not knowing that Pepe survived, has hanged herself.

The closing lines of the play show Bernarda characteristically preoccupied with the family's reputation, not registering that Adela and Pepe had an affair due to her moral code. She insists that Adela has died a virgin and demands that this be made known to the whole town. Bernarda forbids her daughters to cry.

Adaptations
Film adaptations include:
 La casa de Bernarda Alba (1987)
 English language British film of a Royal Court Theatre, London 1986 production The House of Bernarda Alba (1991)
 1991, The house of Bernarda Alba with: Glenda Jackson  (Bernarda Alba), Joan Plowright (Poncia). Director: Nuria Espert.
 1991 Indian film directed by Govind Nihlani, Rukmavati ki Haveli.
 Since 2004, the Moroccan adaptation of La casa de Bernarda Alba has been played in theatres in Morocco and across the world. The adaptation was done by Yassine Fennane, and played by Nora Skalli, Samia Akariou, Nadia El Alami, Saâdia Azegoun, Saâdia Ladib and Hind Esâadidi. Later on, the play was extended to a television series called Bnat Lalla Mennana and was aired on 2M between 2012 and 2014.

In 1967, choreographer Eleo Pomare adapted the play into his ballet, Las Desenamoradas, featuring music by John Coltrane.

The play was adapted as an opera, Bernarda Albas Haus, by Aribert Reimann; it premiered in 2000.

In 2006, the play was adapted into musical form by Michael John LaChiusa.  Under the title Bernarda Alba, it opened at Lincoln Center's Mitzi Newhouse Theater on March 6, 2006, starring Phylicia Rashad in the title role, with a cast that also included Daphne Rubin-Vega.

In 2012, Emily Mann adapted Federico García Lorca's  original, shifting the location from 1930s Andalusia, Spain, to contemporary Iran. Her adaptation opened at the Almeida Theatre under the director Bijan Sheibani, starring Shohreh Aghdashloo as the title character and Hara Yannas as Adela.

Steven Dykes wrote a production named 'Homestead' for the American Theatre Arts (ATA) students in 2004 which was revived in 2013 (The Barn Theatre). The original production went on to perform at The Courtyard in Covent Garden, with members of an ATA graduate company Shady Dolls.

In August 2012, Hyderabad, India based theatre group Sutradhar staged Birjees Qadar Ka Kunba, an Urdu/Hindustani adaptation of The House of Bernarda Alba. Directed by Vinay Varma and scripted by Dr. Raghuvir Sahay, the play adapted Lorca's original to a more Indian matriarch family setup. The play boasted of a cast of more than 10 women actors with Vaishali Bisht as Birjees Qadar (Bernard Alba) and Deepti Girotra as Hasan baandi (La Poncia).

In 2018, dramatist Patricia Cornelius adapted The House of Bernarda Alba for Melbourne Theatre Company, retelling the story as a family drama set in a mining town in contemporary Western Australia. The adaptation was staged at the Fairfax Studio, and featured Candy Bowers as Martirio (renamed "Marti"), Peta Brady as Angustias (renamed "Angela"), Julie Forsyth as Poncia (renamed "Penelope"), Bessie Holland as Magdalena (renamed "Magda"), Sue Jones as Maria Josefa, Melita Jurisic as Bernarda Alba (renamed "Bernadette"), and Emily Milledge as Adela (renamed "Adele").

In 2019, Dulaang Unibersidad ng Pilipinas staged Lorca's "La Casa de Bernarda Alba" for its 44th theatre season under the direction of Alexander Cortez. 'The House of Bernarda Alba | Ang Tahanan ni Bernarda Alba' was translated by Daisy Lopez to English and translated by Alexander Cortez himself to Filipino.

References

Lima, Robert. The Theatre of Garcia Lorca. New York: Las Americas Publishing Co., 1963.

External links
 Full text of the play in Spanish
 Spanish: El sentido trágico en La casa de Bernarda Alba, y algunas relaciones con Yerma y Bodas de Sangre, de Lorca.

Plays by Federico García Lorca
Fiction about suicide
1936 plays
1945 plays
Spanish plays adapted into films
Plays adapted into operas